Ursula Lingen (9 February 1928 – 20 October 2014) was a German-Austrian actress.

Life
Lingen was the daughter of actor Theo Lingen and actress Marianne Zoff, the first wife of Bertolt Brecht. Zoff's daughter, actress Hanne Hiob, was Ursula Lingen's half-sister. She was married to the actor and film director Kurt Meisel.

Filmography

References

External links

Ursula Lingen, filmportal.de (in German)

1928 births
2014 deaths
Austrian Jews
Austrian people of German descent
Austrian television actresses
Actresses from Berlin
Lingen family